German submarine U-852 was a Type IXD2 U-boat built for Nazi Germany's Kriegsmarine during World War II. The submarine, which was a special long-range version of the Type IX, had four bow and two stern torpedo tubes and a Focke-Achgelis Fa 330 Bachstelze cable-towed lookout gyroglider. It was laid down in Bremen and completed in June 1943. She was commanded by Kapitänleutnant Heinz-Wilhelm Eck, who led her through her sea trials and onto her first war patrol on 18 January 1944.

Eck and his officers were the only Kriegsmarine submariners to be tried for war crimes at the end of World War II in Europe. They were convicted at a British military tribunal in Hamburg, (held concurrently during the Nuremberg Trials) for killing the survivors of the torpedoed Greek steamer  in 1944.

Design
German Type IXD2 submarines were considerably larger than the original Type IXs. U-852 had a displacement of  when at the surface and  while submerged. She had two shafts and two  propellers.

U-852 was fitted with six  torpedo tubes (four fitted at the bow and two at the stern), 24 torpedoes, one  SK C/32 naval gun, 150 rounds, and a  SK C/30 with 2575 rounds as well as two  C/30 anti-aircraft guns with 8100 rounds. The boat had a complement of fifty-five.

Asian mission

Peleus
In early 1944, the Kriegsmarine dispatched U-852 on a top-secret mission to disrupt the Allies' Far East war effort by attacking sea lanes in the Indian Ocean. However, to do this successfully the submarine would have to maintain a high-level of secrecy throughout her journey from Europe. On 13 March while crossing the latitude of Freetown in the Atlantic Ocean, the U-boat spotted the lone Greek steamer . Eck, despite his mission, decided to attack the ship. After stalking her until nightfall, the steamer was sunk with two torpedoes.

However, the sinking of the Peleus had created a large debris field containing survivors in rafts and clinging to wreckage. Eck decided that this would indicate to any Allied shipping patrol aircraft there was a U-boat in the area, so he ordered his junior officers to destroy the wreckage by firing into it using hand grenades and automatic weapons. They did this while the rest of the crew remained below decks. There were only three survivors from the 35-man Peleus.

Dahomian
Two weeks later the U-852 sank the British cargo ship Dahomian off Cape Town on 1 April. This time the U-852 left rather than attack the survivors.

Capture
On 30 April 1944, U-852 was spotted in the Indian Ocean by a Vickers Wellington bomber flying from Aden. After being left unable to dive due to damage from aerial depth charges, she headed for the coast of Somalia. However, before reaching land the U-boat came under attack from six RAF bombers from 621 Squadron. Seven crewmen were lost in the engagement; the remainder fled ashore. Fifty-eight were captured by the Somaliland Camel Corps and local militia.

A British boarding party examined the wrecked U-boat and retrieved Eck's Kriegstagebuch ("War Diary"), which proved crucial in constructing the Allied case against him and his men. The British also discovered the Fa 330 Bachstelze rotor kite, a towed one-man aerial observation platform.

War crimes trial
In November 1945, Eck and the U-852'''s four junior officers were tried by the British at a special military tribunal in Hamburg for killing the crew from the Peleus. The German commander said he carried out the attack because there might have been communications equipment on the survivors’ rafts and the Laconia Order forbade him from helping the crews of sunk enemy ships. However, the British tribunal rejected his plea of “operational necessity” and sentenced him to death. Despite claiming they were "only following orders", the boat's second-in-command, August Hoffmann, and Walter Weisspfennig, the ship's doctor (who was condemned for using a weapon in contravention of the Geneva Convention) were also given the death penalty.

Hans Lenz, the engineering officer, who had opposed Eck's order but eventually carried it out was given a life sentence (but was released seven years later, in 1952). Wolfgang Schwender, an enlisted engineer, who said he only shot at debris not survivors - until being replaced by the reluctant Lenz - received 15 years (but was paroled six years later, in 1951). On 30 November 1945, Eck, Hoffmann and  Weisspfennig were executed by naval firing squad.

Summary of raiding history

See also

Notes

References

 

Further reading
 Bridgland, Tony, Waves of Hate'', Leo Cooper, Great Britain: 2002. .

External links
Submarine atrocities(Archived 2009-10-25)

World War II submarines of Germany
German Type IX submarines
World War II shipwrecks in the Indian Ocean
Massacres committed by Nazi Germany
Nazi war crimes
U-boats commissioned in 1943
Indian Ocean U-Boats
1943 ships
Ships built in Bremen (state)
U-boats scuttled in 1944
Maritime incidents in May 1944
Military history of British Somaliland during World War II
World War II crimes